Ariana Kukors (born June 1, 1989) is an American former competition swimmer and former world record holder in the 200-meter individual medley (long course).  Ariana now works in private coaching related to athletic performance. Kukors has won a total of seven medals in major international competition, two golds, three silvers, and two bronze spanning the World and the Pan Pacific Championships.  She placed fifth in the 200-meter individual medley event at the 2012 Summer Olympics.

Personal

Kukors was born in Federal Way, Washington, in 1989, the daughter of Peter and Jaapje Kukors.  Kukors began swimming at the age of five because of the influence of her older sister, Emily, who swam for Auburn University.  Kukors also has one younger sister, Mattie, who previously swam for the University of Michigan from 2009 to 2011, and now swims for Arizona State University.  Kukors is a 2007 graduate of Auburn Mountainview High School in Auburn, Washington.  Kukors swam for the Washington Huskies swim team at the University of Washington for one year, but left the university the year before the swim teams were cut as a cost-saving measure by the UW athletic department.  In August 2009, Kukors relocated to Fullerton, California to train with the Fullerton Aquatics Sports Team (FAST), after her coach Sean Hutchison was named head coach. Kukors trains alongside Katie Hoff, Margaret Hoelzer, and Caroline Burckle.  Kukors is sponsored by TYR. Kukors graduated from Chapman University with a bachelor's degree in business in 2012.

Career

2004–2005

As a fifteen-year-old, Kukors competed at the 2004 U.S. Olympic Team Trials in the 200-meter individual medley but did not advance past the semi-finals, finishing 10th overall. The following year, Kukors competed at the 2005 World Championship Trials but did not qualify for the 2005 World Aquatics Championships.  Her best results came in the 200 and 400-meter individual medley where she finished fifth.

2006–2008

At the 2006 National Championships, Kukors qualified to swim at the 2006 Pan Pacific Swimming Championships and the 2007 World Aquatics Championships by finishing in second place in the 400-meter individual medley. Kukors also placed fourth in the 200-meter individual medley and fifth in the 100-meter backstroke.

At the 2006 Pan Pacific Swimming Championships in Victoria, British Columbia, Kukors earned the first international medal of her career by finishing in second place behind compatriot Katie Hoff in the 400-meter individual medley. The following year, Kukors competed at the 2007 World Aquatics Championships in Melbourne, Australia, and placed fifth in the 400-meter individual medley.

At the 2008 U.S. Olympic Team Trials, Kukors placed third in the 200-meter individual medley behind Katie Hoff and Natalie Coughlin, who edged her out by eight hundredths of a second. Kukors also placed sixth in the 400-meter individual medley and the 200-meter breaststroke.

2009

At the 2009 National Championships, Kukors only qualified to swim in the 4×200-meter freestyle relay at the 2009 World Aquatics Championships by finishing in third place in the 200-meter freestyle. In the 200-meter individual medley, Kukors placed third behind Julia Smit and Elizabeth Pelton. Only the top two finishers qualify to compete in one event at the FINA World Championships.  However, Pelton withdrew from the event and was replaced by Kukors.  Kukors also placed fourth in the 400-meter individual medley.

At the 2009 World Aquatics Championships in Rome, Kukors won one gold and one silver medal.  In her first event, the 200-meter individual medley, Kukors won gold in world record time.  In the heats of the 200-meter individual medley, Kukors posted an Americas and championship record time of 2:08.53, just off Stephanie Rice's world record of 2:08.45. In the semi-finals, Kukors broke Rice's world record with a time of 2:07.03, over a second better than the previous mark. In the final of the 200-meter individual medley, Kukors won the gold and broke her own world record with a time of 2:06.15. In her second event, Kukors won a silver medal in the 4×200-meter freestyle relay with Dana Vollmer, Lacey Nymeyer, and Allison Schmitt.

For her performance in 2009, she was named the American Swimmer of the Year by Swimming World Magazine.

2010

At the 2010 National Championships, Kukors qualified to compete at the 2010 Pan Pacific Swimming Championships by finishing first in the 200-meter individual medley and second in the 400-meter individual medley. At the 2010 Pan Pacific Swimming Championships, Kukors won silver in the 200-meter individual medley, finishing behind Australian Emily Seebohm. Kukors also finished ninth overall in the 400-meter individual medley.

At the end of 2010, Kukors competed at the 2010 FINA Short Course World Championships in Dubai, where she won one gold and one bronze medal.  In the 100-meter individual medley, Kukors broke the championship record twice.  In the final, her time of 58.95 was slightly behind her championship record time of 58.65 set in the semi-finals, but was still good enough for gold. In the 200-meter individual medley, Kukors placed third behind Spaniard Mireia Belmonte and Chinese swimmer Ye Shiwen. Kukors also competed in the 400-meter individual medley, where she finished sixth.

2011

At the 2011 World Aquatics Championships in Shanghai, Kukors competed in one event, the 200-meter individual medley.  She was not able to defend her 2009 crown, and finished in third place behind Chinese Ye Shiwen, and Australian Alicia Coutts with a time of 2:09.12.

2012

At the 2012 United States Olympic Trials, the U.S. qualifying meet for the Olympics, Kukors qualified for the U.S. Olympic team by finishing second in the 200-meter individual medley with a time of 2:11.30. At the 2012 Summer Olympics in London, she placed fifth in the finals of the 200-meter individual medley.

Retirement

Kukors officially announced her retirement from competition on September 26, 2013. She now works as the director of health inspiration for LifeWise Health Plan of Washington and writes for their online magazine Actively Northwest.

See also

 List of Chapman University people
 List of United States records in swimming
 List of University of Washington people
 List of World Aquatics Championships medalists in swimming (women)
 List of world records in swimming
 World record progression 200 metres individual medley

References

External links
 
 
 
 
 

1989 births
Living people
American female breaststroke swimmers
American female freestyle swimmers
American female medley swimmers
Olympic swimmers of the United States
People from Auburn, Washington
People from Federal Way, Washington
Sportspeople from King County, Washington
Swimmers at the 2012 Summer Olympics
Washington Huskies women's swimmers
World Aquatics Championships medalists in swimming
World record setters in swimming
Medalists at the FINA World Swimming Championships (25 m)
Michigan Wolverines women's swimmers
21st-century American women